Lankascincus fallax,  also known commonly as the common supple skink and Peters's tree skink, is a species of lizard in the family Scincidae. The species is endemic to the island of Sri Lanka.

Description
Fronto-parietal is fused, unlike in all other Lanka skinks (where it is divided on others). Midbody scales rows 24-28. Lamellae under fourth toe are 13-18.
Males are distinguish with red-throat. Dorsum pale to dark brown each dorsal scale with a pale stripe joining to form longitudinal line on dorsum. A yellowish brown stripe running from posterior edge of the eye to beyond middle of the tail. Throat color varies from red, blue or cream, with white spots, presumably depending on the reproductive status. Venter unpatterned creamy. Ventral scales with a frosted pattern, forming longitudinal lines. 
Iris yellow in female and bright red in males.

Reproduction
Lay 1 egg laid per clutch in loose soil.

References

Further reading
Peters W (1860). "Mittheilung über einige interessante Amphibien, welche von dem durch seine zoologischen Schriften rühmlichst bekannten österreichischen Naturforscher Professor Schmarda während seiner auf mehrere Weltheile ausgedehnten, besonders auf wirbellose Thiere gerichteten, naturwissenschaftlichen Reise, mit deren Veröffentlichung Hr. Schmarda gegenwärtig in Berlin beschäftigt ist, auf der Insel Ceylon gesammelt wurden ". Monatsberichte der Königlichen Preussischen Akademie der Wissenschaften zu Berlin 1860: 182–186. (Lygosoma fallax, new species, pp. 184–185). (in German).

External links
 http://biodiversityofsrilanka.blogspot.com/2013/05/common-lanka-skink-lankascincus-fallax.html
 Two new species of Lanka Skink found from Adam's Peak, found by L.M Wickramasinghe et.al.
 Photos of Common Supple Skink

Reptiles of Sri Lanka
Lankascincus
Reptiles described in 1860
Taxa named by Wilhelm Peters